Dahlia Malkhi is an Israeli-American computer scientist who works on distributed systems and cryptocurrency.

Education and career
Malkhi earned her bachelor's, master's, and doctoral degrees from the Hebrew University of Jerusalem, finishing her Ph.D. under the supervision of Danny Dolev. She taught at the Hebrew University until 2004, and then joined Microsoft Research at their Silicon Valley research center. In 2014, when Microsoft closed the center, she moved to VMware, a company working in  cloud computing and platform virtualization.

She became a lead researcher at Novi Financial, a subsidiary of Meta Platforms (Facebook), and the lead maintainer of Meta's Libra cryptocurrency project. Libra later became Diem and Malkhi became chief technology officer at the Diem Association. In 2022, the Diem project shut down, and she moved to Chainlink Labs as their chief research officer.

Recognition
In 2011, Malkhi became a Fellow of the Association for Computing Machinery "for contributions to fault-tolerant distributed computing." In 2021, she received the Technical Achievement Award of the IEEE Computer Society Technical Committee on Distributed Processing.

Selected publications
. Preliminary version in ACM Symposium on Theory of Computing, STOC '97, .
.
.

References

External links

Year of birth missing (living people)
Living people
American women computer scientists
American computer scientists
Israeli women computer scientists
Israeli computer scientists
Hebrew University of Jerusalem School of Computer Science & Engineering alumni
Academic staff of the Hebrew University of Jerusalem
Fellows of the Association for Computing Machinery
American women academics
21st-century American women